Robert Andrew Fudge (February 3, 1901 – September 27, 1955) was an American football coach.  He served as the head football coach at West Virginia Trade School—now known as West Virginia University Institute of Technology—in Montgomery, West Virginia, for one season, in 1920, compiling a record of 1–4–1.  Fudge died in 1955 after a cerebral hemorrhage.

References

1901 births
1955 deaths
West Virginia Tech Golden Bears football coaches
People from Covington, Virginia